Columbia County Courthouse may refer to:

Columbia County Courthouse (Arkansas), Magnolia, Arkansas
Columbia County Courthouse (Florida), Lake City, Florida
Columbia County Courthouse (Georgia), Appling, Georgia
First Columbia County Courthouse, Claverack, New York
Columbia County Courthouse (Washington), Dayton, Washington, listed on the National Register of Historic Places